Erik Albert Pettersson (5 May 1885 – 8 March 1960) was a Swedish weightlifter. He won two bronze medals at international competitions: in the lightweight division at the 1909 European Championships, and in the middleweight category (−75 kg) at the 1920 Summer Olympics. Aged 35 he was the oldest weightlifting competitor at those games.

References

External links

1885 births
1960 deaths
Sportspeople from Örebro
Swedish male weightlifters
Olympic weightlifters of Sweden
Weightlifters at the 1920 Summer Olympics
Olympic bronze medalists for Sweden
Olympic medalists in weightlifting
Medalists at the 1920 Summer Olympics
20th-century Swedish people